Karim Khalaf (also Romanized as Karīm Khalaf; also known as Karīm Khalīf and Khalaf) is a village in Seyyed Abbas Rural District, Shavur District, Shush County, Khuzestan Province, Iran. At the 2006 census, its population was 126, in 24 families.

References 

Populated places in Shush County